Elizabeth Vega (born 19 November 1998) is an American-born Nicaraguan footballer who plays as a midfielder for the Nicaragua women's national team.

Early life
Vega was raised in Snellville, Georgia.

High school and college career
Vega has attended the Greater Atlanta Christian School in Norcross, Georgia and played club soccer for Atlanta Fire Unites Soccer Association as well as the Gwinnett Soccer Academy as part of the Elite Clubs National League (ECNL). Vega has attended the Rhodes College in Memphis, Tennessee.

International career
Vega capped for Nicaragua at senior level during the 2018 CONCACAF Women's Championship qualification and the 2020 CONCACAF Women's Olympic Qualifying Championship qualification.

References 

1998 births
Living people
People with acquired Nicaraguan citizenship
Nicaraguan women's footballers
Women's association football midfielders
Nicaragua women's international footballers
People from Snellville, Georgia
Sportspeople from the Atlanta metropolitan area
Soccer players from Georgia (U.S. state)
American women's soccer players
Rhodes College alumni
College women's soccer players in the United States
American people of Nicaraguan descent